Philosophy and Belief is a school subject taught at schools across South America. The subject bears many similarities to Religious Education (RE), a subject taught across the United Kingdom and other Commonwealth Countries. Its main differences are that it has more emphasis on areas such as debating, moral and philosophical issues and dilemmas, wars, and philosophy concerning life and death. It also looks at sexism, racism and religion in the media.

It has received criticism for not teaching enough about religion. However, there are others who argue that it does, in a more engaging and fun way. Overall, teaching students about life skills.

Philosophy education